Marcelo Amado Djaló Taritolay (born 8 October 1993), simply known as Marcelo, is a professional footballer who plays as a centre back for Hércules. Born in Spain, he represents Guinea-Bissau at international level.

Club career

Early career
Born in Barcelona, Spain, Marcelo was a Real Madrid youth graduate. In July 2012, after being released, he went on a trial at Segunda División B's CF Badalona, signing a contract one month later. He made his senior debuts with the latter in the 2012–13 campaign, appearing in 21 matches and scoring two goals, but left in June 2013.

In the summer of 2013, Marcelo moved to Granada CF, being assigned to the reserves also in the third level. On 19 August 2014 he signed for Juventus F.C., being immediately loaned back to the Andalusians for one year.

On 14 January 2015, Marcelo made his first team debut, playing the full 90 minutes in a 0–4 away loss against Sevilla FC for the season's Copa del Rey.

Girona / UCAM Murcia
On 11 July 2015, Marcelo moved to Girona FC, in a season-long loan deal. His debut for the club came on 9 September, where he started and scored a last-minute equalizer in a 2–2 away draw against Gimnàstic de Tarragona for the national cup; his side, however, was knocked out on penalties.

Marcelo failed to make a single league appearance for the club, being only a sixth choice behind Florian Lejeune, Kiko Olivas, Pedro Alcalá, Richy and Carles Mas. On 18 April 2016, he terminated his loan with the Catalans, and immediately joined UCAM Murcia CF on loan until June.

Lugo
On 7 July, after helping UCAM in the club's first ever promotion to Segunda División, Marcelo signed a two-year deal with CD Lugo. He made his debut in the second tier on 27 August 2016, coming on as a second-half substitute for Carlos Hernández in a 3–3 home draw against Real Zaragoza.

Marcelo scored his first goal in the category on 11 December 2016, netting his team's second in a 3–1 home win against CD Numancia. He contributed with two goals in 25 appearances during the campaign, as his side finished eighth.

Fulham
Fulham confirmed the signing of Marcelo on 3 July 2017. He signed a three-year contract for an undisclosed fee. He made his Fulham debut in an EFL Cup tie against Wycombe Wanderers on 8 August 2017.

On 15 August 2018, Marcelo returned to Spain and its second division after agreeing to a one-year loan deal with Extremadura UD. His loan was cut short on 31 January 2019 after 12 league appearances.

Return to Lugo
On 27 August 2019, Marcelo returned to Lugo after agreeing to a three-year contract.

Boavista
On 31 August 2021, he joined Boavista in Portugal, signing a contract until the end of the 2021–22 season, with an option for an additional year. On 18 November 2021, Marcelo's contract with Boavista was terminated for "personal and family reasons".

Hercules
On 5 August 2022, Marcelo signed a one-year contract with Hércules in the fourth-tier Segunda Federación. On 4 September 2022, in a season opener against Mallorca B, Marcelo suffered a tibia fracture. His knee ligaments were also damaged and the recovery after surgery was expected to last approximately a year.

International career
Djaló qualified to play for Spain through his birth in Barcelona, Guinea-Bissau through his father, or Argentina through his mother. In March 2019, he accepted a call-up from Guinea-Bissau for a 2019 Africa Cup of Nations qualifying match against Mozambique, but did not make his debut.

He made his debut on 8 June 2019 in a friendly against Angola, as a starter.
Represented the national team at 2019 Africa Cup of Nations.

Personal life
Djaló was born in Spain, and is of Bissau-Guinean and Argentine descent.

Career statistics

References

External links

1993 births
Footballers from Barcelona
Spanish people of Bissau-Guinean descent
Spanish sportspeople of African descent
Spanish people of Argentine descent
Citizens of Guinea-Bissau through descent
Bissau-Guinean people of Argentine descent
Living people
Bissau-Guinean footballers
Guinea-Bissau international footballers
Association football central defenders
CE Mataró players
CF Badalona players
Club Recreativo Granada players
Granada CF footballers
Juventus F.C. players
Girona FC players
UCAM Murcia CF players
CD Lugo players
Fulham F.C. players
Extremadura UD footballers
Boavista F.C. players
Hércules CF players
Segunda División B players
Segunda División players
English Football League players
Primeira Liga players
Segunda Federación players
2019 Africa Cup of Nations players
Bissau-Guinean expatriate footballers
Spanish expatriate footballers
Bissau-Guinean expatriate sportspeople in England
Spanish expatriate sportspeople in England
Expatriate footballers in England
Bissau-Guinean expatriate sportspeople in Portugal
Spanish expatriate sportspeople in Portugal
Expatriate footballers in Portugal